Serce matki (Polish for Mother's Heart) is a 1938 Polish melodrama film directed by Michał Waszyński.

Cast
 Stanisława Angel-Engelówna as Maria
 Irena Malkiewicz as Elżbieta Borzęcka
 Lidia Wysocka as Lusia
 Ina Benita as Hanka
 Kazimierz Wilamowski as Wiesław Borzęcki
 Mieczysław Cybulski as Władysław
 Aleksander Zelwerowicz as schoolmaster
 Józef Orwid as shopkeeper
 Stanisław Sielański as veterinarian

External links 
 
 Serce matki at filmpolski.pl

1938 films
1930s Polish-language films
Polish black-and-white films
Films directed by Michał Waszyński
Films based on Polish novels
1938 drama films
Polish drama films
Melodrama films